GWU may refer to:

Education 
 George Washington University, in Washington, DC
 Gardner–Webb University, in Boiling Springs, North Carolina
 George Wythe University, in Cedar City, Utah
 Gifu Women's University, in Gifu, Japan

Trade unions 
 Game Workers Unite
 Gambia Workers' Union
 General Workers' Union (Malta)
 General Workers' Union (Belize)